Euphorbia fulgens, the scarlet plume, is a species of flowering plant in the spurge family Euphorbiaceae, native to Mexico. In winter orange-red flowers growing in the leaf axils cover the length of the branches.

The Latin specific epithet fulgens means “shining, glistening”.

It is not hardy, requiring temperatures above . It must therefore be grown under glass in temperate regions. It has gained the Royal Horticultural Society’s Award of Garden Merit.

References

Flora of Mexico
fulgens